Bilateral relations between Saudi Arabia and the United States began in 1933 when full diplomatic relations were established and became formalized in the 1951 Mutual Defense Assistance Agreement. Despite the differences between the two countries—an Islamic absolute monarchy, and a secular constitutional republic—the two countries have been allies ever since. The core logic underpinning the relationship is that the United States of America (USA) provides military protection of the Kingdom in exchange for a reliable oil supply from the Saudis, pricing of oil in USA dollars, and Saudi support for American foreign policy operations across the world. Ever since the modern relationship began in 1945, the U.S. has been willing to overlook some of the kingdom's  more unusual aspects such as Wahhabism, its human rights and alleged state-sponsored terrorism as long as it maintained oil production and supported USA national security policies.

The two countries have disagreed with regard to Israel, as well as the embargo of the U.S. and its allies by Saudi Arabia and other Middle East oil exporters during the 1973 oil crisis (which raised oil prices considerably), the 2003 U.S.-led invasion of Iraq (which Saudi Arabia opposed), aspects of the "War on Terror", and what many in the U.S. see as the pernicious influence of Saudi Arabia after the September 11 attacks. In recent years, particularly the Barack Obama administration, the relationship between the two countries became strained and witnessed major decline. However, the relationship was strengthened by the Trump Administration's trip to Saudi Arabia in May 2017. The October 2018 assassination of Saudi dissident and Washington Post journalist Jamal Khashoggi in a Saudi consulate in Turkey caused a serious rift between the two countries. The United States sanctioned some Saudi nationals, and Congress unsuccessfully attempted to cut off U.S. weapons sales to Saudis, related to the war in Yemen, due to opposition from the Trump administration. Turkish authorities and U.S. intelligence agencies concluded the killing was done on the order of Mohammed bin Salman, the crown prince of Saudi Arabia.

Historically, opinion polls between the two nations showed negative feelings between the American people and Saudi people despite the strong relationship between the two countries. Most Saudi criticism pertained to America's support of Israel during the Arab-Israeli conflict; American criticism pertained to lack of human rights in Saudi Arabia and the alleged Saudi government role in the September 11 attacks. A poll of Saudis by Zogby International (2002) and BBC (between October 2005 and January 2006) found 51% of Saudis had a negative view of the American people in 2002; in 2005–2006, Saudi public opinion was sharply divided with 38% viewing U.S. influence positively and 38% viewing U.S. influence negatively. However, as of July 2022, 92% of young Saudis viewed the United States as an ally of their nation. In 2019, Saudi Arabian students formed the 4th largest group of international students studying in the United States, representing 3.4% of all foreigners pursuing higher education in the U.S. A December 2013 poll found 57% of Americans polled had an hostile view towards Saudi Arabia and 27% favorable, while a poll in July 2021 found that 50% of Americans viewed the country at least as a necessary partner of the US.

History

Early history and recognition
King Abdulaziz Al Saud, Ibn Saud as an appellation, the founder of Saudi Arabia, developed close ties with the United States. After unifying his country in 1928, he set about gaining international recognition. Great Britain was the first country to recognize Saudi Arabia as an independent state. In May 1931 the U.S. officially recognized Saudi Arabia by extending full diplomatic recognition. At the same time Ibn Saud granted a concession to the U.S. company, Standard Oil of California, allowing them to explore for oil in the country's Eastern Province, al-Hasa. The company gave the Saudi government £35,000 and also paid assorted rental fees and royalty payments.

In November 1931, a treaty was signed by both nations which included favored nation status. The relationship was still weak, however, as America did not have an interest in establishing missions in Saudi Arabia: at the time, Saudi affairs were handled by the U.S. delegation in Cairo, Egypt; The U.S. finally sent a resident ambassador in 1943.

The relationship between Saudi Arabia and the United States of America was economically strengthened in 1933 when Standard Oil of California was given the concession to explore Saudi Arabian lands for oil. The subsidiary of this company, regarded as California Arabian Standard Oil Company, later dubbed Saudi Aramco carried out a fruitful exploration in 1938, finding oil for the first time. The relationship between the two nations strengthened throughout the next decade, establishing a full diplomatic relationship through a symbolic acceptance of an American envoy in Saudi Arabia.

World War II

As the U.S.–Saudi relationship was growing slowly, World War II was beginning its first phase, with Saudi Arabia remaining neutral. The U.S. was deeply involved in World War II, and as a result, U.S.–Saudi relations were put on the 'back burner'. This negligence left Saudi Arabia vulnerable to attack. Italy, an Axis power, bombed a CASOC oil installation in Dhahran crippling Saudi Arabia's oil production. This attack left Bin Saud scrambling to find an external power that would protect the country, fearing further attacks that would most likely cease the country's oil production and the flow of pilgrims coming into Mecca to perform Hajj, the basis of the Saudi power and economy at that time.

CASOC struck oil near Dhahran, but production over the next several years remained low—only about 42.5 million barrels between 1941 and 1945; less than 1% of the output in the United States over the same time period. CASOC was later renamed the Arabian-American Oil Company (Aramco).

However, as World War II progressed, the United States began to believe that Saudi oil was of strategic importance. As a result, in the interest of national security, the U.S. began to push for greater control over the CASOC concession. On February 16, 1943, President Franklin D. Roosevelt declared that "the defense of Saudi Arabia is vital to the defense of the United States", thereby making possible the extension of the Lend-Lease program to the kingdom. Later that year, the president approved the creation of the state-owned Petroleum Reserves Corporation, with the intent that it purchase all the stock of CASOC and thus gain control of Saudi oil reserves in the region. However, the plan was met with opposition and ultimately failed.

Bin Saud approved the U.S.'s request to allow the U.S. air force to fly over and construct airfields in Saudi Arabia. The oil installations were rebuilt and protected by the U.S., the pilgrims' routes were protected, and the U.S. gained a much needed direct route for military aircraft heading to Iran and the Soviet Union. The first American consulate was opened in Dhahran in 1944.

After World War II

In 1945, after World War II, Saudi citizens began to feel uncomfortable with U.S. forces still operating in Dhahran. In contrast, the Saudi government and officials saw the U.S. forces as a major component of the Saudi military defense strategy. As a result, Ibn Saud balanced the two perspectives by increasing the demands on U.S. forces in Dhahran when the region was highly threatened and lowering it when the danger declined. At this time, due to the start of the Cold War, the U.S. was greatly concerned about Soviet communism and devised a strategy of 'containing' the spread of communism within Arabian Peninsula, putting Saudi security at the top of Washington's list of priorities. Harry S. Truman's administration also promised Bin Saud that he would protect Saudi Arabia from Soviet influence. Therefore, the U.S. increased its presence in the region to protect its interest and its allies. The security relationship between Saudi Arabia and the U.S. was therefore greatly strengthened at the start of the 'cold war'.

Foundation of Aramco
The trade relationship between the United States of America and the Kingdom of Saudi Arabia has long revolved around two central concepts: security and oil. Throughout the next two decades, the 50s and 60s, relations between the two nations grew significantly stronger. In 1950, Aramco and Saudi Arabia agreed on a 50/50 profit distribution of the oil discovered in Saudi Arabia. In 1951 the Mutual Defense Assistance Agreement was put into action, which allowed for the U.S. arms trade to Saudi Arabia, along with a United States military training mission to be centered in Saudi Arabia.

King Saud comes to power (1953)

In the late 1950s, King Saud, the eldest son of Ibn Saud, came to power after his father's death. During King Saud's time U.S.–Saudi relations faced many obstacles concerning the anti-communism strategy. President Dwight D. Eisenhower's new anti-Soviet alliance combined most of "the kingdom's regional rivals and foes", which heightened Saudi suspicions. For this reason, in October 1955, Saud had joined the pro-Soviet strategy with Egyptian president Gamal Abdel Nasser. Furthermore, Saud dismissed the U.S. forces and replaced them by Egyptian forces. Thus, this act had sparked a major difference in position during the relationship. But in 1956, during the Suez crisis, Saud began to cooperate with the U.S. again after Eisenhower forced the reversal of the Israeli, British, and French invasion to seize the canal. King Saud had admired the act and decided to start cooperating with the U.S. As a result, Egyptian power greatly declined while U.S.–Saudi relations were simultaneously improving.

Cold War and Soviet containment
In 1957, Saud decided to renew the U.S. base in Dhahran. In less than a year, after the Egyptian–Syrian unification in 1958, Egypt's pro-Soviet strategy had returned to power. Saud had once again joined their alliance, which declined the U.S.–Saudi relationship to a fairly low point especially after he announced in 1961 that he changed his mind on renewing the U.S. base. In 1962, however, Egypt attacked Saudi Arabia from bases in Yemen during the 1962 Yemeni revolution because of Saudi Arabia's Anti-revolution propaganda, which made Saud seek the U.S. support. President John F. Kennedy immediately responded to Saud's request by sending U.S. warplanes in July 1963 to the war zone to stop the attack which was putting U.S. interests at risk. At the end of the war, shortly before Prince Faisal became king, the relationship rebuilt itself to become healthy again.

As the United Kingdom withdrew from the Persian Gulf region in the late 1960s and early 1970s, the U.S. was reluctant to take on new security commitments. Instead, the Nixon administration sought to rely on local allies to "police" American interests (see Nixon Doctrine). In the Persian Gulf region, this meant relying on Saudi Arabia and Iran as "twin pillars" of regional security. Whereas in 1970 the U.S. provided less than $16 million to Saudi Arabia in military aid, that number increased to $312 million by 1972. As part of the "twin pillars" strategy, the U.S. also attempted to improve relations between the Saudis and the Iranians, such as by persuading Iran to remove its territorial claim to Bahrain.

Oil embargo and energy crises

In November 1964, Faisal became the new king after the conflicts he had with his brother Saud, the erstwhile king. The U.S., on the other hand, was not sure about the outcome of such unplanned change in the Saudi monarchy. Faisal, however, continued the cooperation with the U.S. until October 20, 1973. Then came the low point of the relationship before 9/11, as Faisal decided to contribute in an oil embargo against the U.S. and Europe in favor of the Arab position during the Yom Kippur War. That caused an energy crisis in the U.S.

"America's complete Israel support against the Arabs makes it extremely difficult for us to continue to supply the United States with oil, or even remain friends with the United States," said Faisal in an interview with international media.

Despite the tensions caused by the oil embargo, the U.S. wished to resume relations with the Saudis. Indeed, the great oil wealth accumulated as a result of price increases allowed the Saudis to purchase large sums of American military technology. The embargo was lifted in March 1974 after the U.S. pressured Israel into negotiating with Syria over the Golan Heights. Three months later, "Washington and Riyadh signed a wide-ranging agreement on expanded economic and military cooperation." In the 1975 fiscal year, the two countries signed $2 billion worth of military contracts, including an agreement to send Saudi Arabia 60 fighter jets. The Saudis also argued (partially on behalf of American desires) to keep OPEC price increases in the mid-1970s lower than Iraq and Iran initially wanted.

The Saudis' increase of oil production to stabilize the oil price and the support of anti-communism have all contributed to closer relations with the U.S. In January 1979, the U.S. sent F-15 fighters to Saudi Arabia for further protection from communism. Furthermore, the U.S. and Saudi Arabia were both supporting anti-communist groups in Afghanistan and struggling countries, one of those groups later became known as the Al-Qaeda terrorist organization.

Government purchases

After the Cold War, U.S.–Saudi relations were improving. The U.S. and Saudi companies were actively engaged and paid handsomely for taking on and managing projects in Saudi Arabia. Saudi Arabia transferred $100 billion to the United States for administration, construction, weapons and, in the 1970s and 1980s, for higher education scholarships to the U.S. During that era the U.S. built and administrated numerous military academies, navy ports, and Air Force military airbases. Many of these military facilities were influenced by the U.S., with the needs of cold war aircraft and deployment strategies in mind. Also, the Saudis purchased a great deal of weapons that varied from F-15 war planes to M1 Abrams main battle tanks that later proved useful during the Gulf War. The U.S. pursued a policy of building up and training the Saudi military as a counterweight to Shiite extremism and actions following the revolution in Iran. The U.S. provided top-of-the-line equipment and training, and consulted the Saudi government frequently, acknowledging them as the most important Islamic leader in that part of the world, and a key player in the U.S. security strategy.

The Gulf War
Relations between the two nations solidified even further, past the point of the oil embargo, when the United States of America sent nearly 500,000 soldiers to Saudi Arabia to aid in protection against Iraq. Following Operation Desert Shield, which was a response by President George H. W. Bush to Iraq's invasion of Kuwait in 1990, America kept 5,000 troops in Saudi Arabia to maintain their protection and trade relations.

Iraq's invasion of Kuwait in August 1990 led to the Gulf War, during which the security relationship between the U.S. and Saudi Arabia was greatly strengthened. Concurrently with the U.S. invasion, King Fahd declared war against Iraq. The U.S. was concerned about the safety of Saudi Arabia against Saddam's intention to invade and control the oil reserves in the region. As a result, after King Fahd's approval, President Bush deployed a significant amount of American military forces (up to 543,000 ground troops by the end of the operation) to protect Saudi Arabia from a possible Iraqi invasion; this operation was called Desert Shield. Furthermore, the U.S. sent additional troops in operation Desert Storm with nearly 100,000 Saudi troops sent by Fahd to form a U.S.–Saudi army alliance, along with troops from other allied countries, to attack Iraqi troops in Kuwait and to stop further invasion. During the ground campaign of Operation Desert Storm Iraqi troops were defeated within four days, causing the Iraqis to retreat back to Iraq.

Since the Gulf War, the U.S. had a continued presence of 5,000 troops stationed in Saudi Arabia—a figure that rose to 10,000 during the 2003 conflict in Iraq. Operation Southern Watch enforced the no-fly zones over southern Iraq set up after 1991, and the country's oil exports through the shipping lanes of the Persian Gulf are protected by the U.S. Fifth Fleet, based in Bahrain.

September 11 attacks

On September 11, 2001, terrorist attacks on New York City and Washington, D.C. and in a field near Shanksville, Pennsylvania by four hijacked airplanes killed 2,977 victims and cost an estimated $150 billion in property and infrastructure damage and economic impact, exceeding the death toll and damage caused by the Japanese attack on Pearl Harbor 60 years earlier. 15 of the 19 hijackers in the attacks came from Saudi Arabia, as did the leader of the hijackers' organization, (Osama bin Laden). In the U.S., there followed considerable negative publicity for, and scrutiny of, Saudi Arabia and its teaching of Islam, and a reassessing of the "oil-for-security" alliance with the Al Saud. A 2002 Council on Foreign Relations Terrorist Financing Task Force report found that "for years, individuals and charities based in Saudi Arabia have been the most important source of funds for al-Qaeda. And for years, Saudi officials have turned a blind eye to this problem."

In the backlash against Saudi Arabia and Wahhabism, the Saudi government was portrayed in the media, Senate hearings, and elsewhere as 
a sort of oily heart of darkness, the wellspring of a bleak, hostile value system that is the very antithesis of our own. America's seventy-year alliance with the kingdom has been reappraised as a ghastly mistake, a selling of the soul, a gas-addicted alliance with death.

There was even a proposal at the Defense Policy Board, (an arm of Department of Defense) to consider 'taking Saudi out of Arabia' by forcibly seizing control of the oil fields, giving the Hijaz back to the Hashemites, and delegating control of Medina and Mecca to a multinational committee of moderate, non-Wahhabi Muslims.

In Saudi Arabia itself, anti-American sentiment was described as "intense" and "at an all-time high".

A survey taken by the Saudi intelligence service of "educated Saudis between the ages of 25 and 41" taken shortly after the 9/11 attacks "concluded that 95 percent" of those surveyed supported Bin Laden's cause. (Support for Bin Laden reportedly waned by 2006 and by then, the Saudi population become considerably more pro-American, after Al-Qaeda linked groups staged attacks inside Saudi Arabia.) The proposal at the Defense Policy Board to "take Saudi out of Arabia" was spread as the secret U.S. plan for the kingdom.

In October 2001, The Wall Street Journal reported that Crown Prince Abdullah sent a critical letter to U.S. President George W. Bush on August 29: "A time comes when peoples and nations part. We are at a crossroads. It is time for the United States and Saudi Arabia to look at their separate interests. Those governments that don't feel the pulse of their people and respond to it will suffer the fate of the Shah of Iran."

For over a year after 9/11 Saudi Minister of the Interior (a powerful post whose jurisdiction included domestic intelligence gathering), Prince Nayef bin Abdulaziz Al Saud, insisted that the Saudi hijackers were dupes in a Zionist plot. In December 2002, a Saudi government spokesman declared that his country was the victim of unwarranted American intolerance bordering on hate.

In 2003, several terror attacks targeted U.S. compounds, the Saudi ministry of interior, and several other places occurred inside Saudi Arabia. As a result of these attacks, the U.S. decided to redevelop Saudi law enforcement agencies by providing them with anti-terrorism education, the latest technologies, and by giving them a chance to interact with U.S. law enforcement agencies to gain efficient knowledge and power needed to handle terrorist cases and to enforce anti-terrorist laws.

American politicians and media have accused the Saudi government of supporting terrorism and tolerating a jihadist culture, noting that Osama bin Laden and fifteen out of the nineteen (or 78 percent of) 9/11 hijackers were from Saudi Arabia.

Although some analysts have speculated that Osama bin Laden, who in 1994 had his Saudi nationality revoked and expelled from Saudi Arabia, had chosen 15 Saudi hijackers on purpose to break up the U.S.–Saudi relations, as the U.S. was still suspicious of Saudi Arabia. The Saudi's decided to cooperate with the U.S. on the war on terror. "Terrorism does not belong to any culture, or religion, or political system", said King Abdullah as the opening address of the Counter-terrorism International Conference (CTIC) held in Riyadh in 2005. The cooperation grew broader covering financial, educational, technological aspects both in Saudi Arabia and Muslim-like countries to prevent pro-Al-Qaeda terrorists' activities and ideologies. "It is a high time for the Ulma (Muslim Scholars), and all thinkers, intellectuals, and academics, to shoulder their responsibilities towards the enlightenment of the people, especially the young people, and protect them from deviant ideas" said Sheikh Saleh bin Abdulaziz Alsheikh, Minister of Islamic Affairs, in the CTIC.

Almost all members of the CTIC agreed that Al-Qaeda target less educated Muslims by convincing them that they are warriors of God, but they really convince them to only accomplish their political goals. Three years after the Saudi Serious and active role on anti-terrorist, Al-Qaeda began launching multiple attacks targeting Saudi government buildings and U.S. compounds in Saudi grounds. Their attacks exhibit their revenge against Saudi Arabia's cooperation with the U.S. trying to stop further U.S.–Saudi anti-terrorist movements and trying to corrode the U.S.–Saudi relationship and to annihilate it.

After these changes, the Saudi government was more equipped in preventing terrorist activities. They caught a large number of Saudi terrorists and terrorists from other countries (some of them American) that had connections with al-Qaeda in one way or another. Some of these criminals held high rank in terrorist society, which helped diffuse many terrorist cells. In a matter of months, Saudi law enforcement officials were successfully able to stop and prevent terrorist activities. Also, they were successful in finding the source of terrorist financing.

In March 2018, a U.S. judge formally allowed a suit to move forward against Saudi Arabia government brought by 9/11 survivors and victim's families.

In May 2021, 22 federal lawmakers from New York and New Jersey pressured President Joe Biden to release the classified FBI documents that cite the role of Saudi Arabia in the 9/11 terror attacks. The lawmakers Ione Republican Nicole Malliotakis and NY Sens. Chuck Schumer and Kirsten Gillibrand, in their letter to the US Attorney General Merrick Garland challenged the "state secrets privilege" that was invoked by former US Presidents to restrict the classified FBI report from releasing. The evidence of Saudi Arabian involvement in the September 11 attacks first surfaced in a 2012 FBI memo during Operation Encore investigation.

2013 rift

The United States after 2000 developed techniques to recover oil and gas much more cheaply, and soon became an exporter. Instead of depending on purchases of Middle Eastern oil and gas, it became a rival. Alwaleed bin Talal warned Saudi ministers in May 2013 that shale gas production in the U.S. would eventually pose a threat to the kingdom's oil-dependent economy. Despite this, the two countries still maintained a positive relationship.

In October 2013, Saudi intelligence chief Prince Bandar bin Sultan suggested a distancing of Saudi Arabia–United States relations as a result of differences between the two countries over the Syrian civil war and diplomatic overtures between Iran and the Obama administration. The Saudis rejected a rotating seat on the UN Security Council that month (despite previously campaigning for such a seat), in protest of American policy over those issues.

Saudi Arabia was cautiously supportive of a Western-negotiated interim agreement with Iran over its nuclear program. President Obama called King Abdullah to brief him about the agreement, and the White House said the leaders agreed to "consult regularly" about the U.S.'s negotiations with Iran.

2016 U.S. presidential election

In August 2016, Donald Trump Jr. had a meeting with an envoy representing Saudi Arabia's Crown Prince and de facto ruler Mohammad bin Salman, and Mohammed bin Zayed Al Nahyan, the Crown Prince of Abu Dhabi. The envoy offered help to the Trump presidential campaign, which would be illegal under U.S. law. The meeting included Lebanese-American lobbyist George Nader, Joel Zamel, an Israeli specialist in social media manipulation, and Blackwater founder Erik Prince.

Special Counsel Robert Mueller investigated the Trump campaign's possible ties to Saudi Arabia. Lebanese-American businessman Ahmad Khawaja claimed that Saudi Arabia and UAE illegally funneled millions of dollars into the Trump's campaign.

In April 2017, U.S. President Donald J. Trump attempted to repair the United States' relationship with Saudi Arabia by having the U.S. Defense Secretary visit Saudi Arabia. Trump has stated that he aims to help and assist Saudi Arabia in terms of military protection to receive beneficial economic compensation for the United States in return.

2017 arms deal and war in Yemen

Significant numbers of Americans have criticized the conduct of Saudi Arabia in its ongoing intervention in the Yemeni Civil War, including alleged war crimes such as bombing of hospitals, gas stations, water infrastructure, marketplaces and other groups of civilians, and archaeological monuments; declaring the entire Saada Governorate a military target; use of cluster bombs; and enforcing a blockade of food and medical supplies that has triggered a famine. Critics oppose U.S. support of Saudi Arabia for this operation, which they say does not benefit the national security interests of the United States, and they object to the United States selling arms to Saudi Arabia for use in Yemen.

The approval of the 2017 arms deal was opposed by various lawmakers, including GOP Senators Mike Lee, Rand Paul, Todd Young and Dean Heller along with most Democrat Senators who voted to advance the measure to block the sale, citing the human rights violations by Saudi Arabia in the Yemeni Civil War. Among the senators who voted against moving the measure to block the sale were Democratic Senators Joe Donnelly, Claire McCaskill, Bill Nelson, Joe Manchin and Mark Warner along with top Republicans, including Majority Leader Mitch McConnell, Bob Corker and John McCain.

Tulsi Gabbard, a Democratic Representative from Hawaii, criticized the move, saying that Saudi Arabia is "a country with a devastating record of human rights violations at home and abroad, and a long history of providing support to terrorist organizations that threaten the American people". Rand Paul introduced a bill to try to block the plan calling it a "travesty".

U.S. Senator Chris Murphy accused the United States of complicity in Yemen's humanitarian crisis, saying: "Thousands and thousands inside Yemen today are dying. ... This horror is caused in part by our decision to facilitate a bombing campaign that is murdering children and to endorse a Saudi strategy inside Yemen that is deliberately using disease and starvation and the withdrawal of humanitarian support as a tactic."

A June 2022 report by The Washington Post and the Security Force Monitor at Columbia Law School's Human Rights Institute stated that a "substantial portion" of airstrikes by the Saudi-led campaign were "carried out by jets developed, maintained and sold by U.S. companies, and by pilots who were trained by the US military". According to the U.S.-based Armed Conflict Location and Event Data Project (ACLED) analysis, airstrikes by the Saudi-led coalition had killed 24,000 people, including 9,000 civilians.

Jamal Khashoggi assassination
In October 2018, the Jamal Khashoggi case put the U.S. into a difficult situation as Trump and his son-in-law, Jared Kushner, share a strong personal and official bond with Mohammad bin Salman. During an interview, Trump vowed to get to the bottom of the case and that there would be "severe punishment" if the Saudi kingdom is found to be involved in the disappearance or assassination of the journalist. A vexed reply came from the Saudi Foreign Ministry saying if Saudi Arabia "receives any action, it will respond with greater action," citing the oil-rich kingdom's "influential and vital role in the global economy."

After weeks of denial, Saudi Arabia accepted that Khashoggi died at the Saudi consulate in Istanbul during a "fistfight." Adel al-Jubeir described the journalist's death as a "murder" and a "tremendous mistake." But he denied the knowledge of whereabouts of the body. Following the case, the U.S. promised to revoke the visas of Saudi nationals responsible for Khashoggi's death.

In November 2018, Trump defended Saudi Arabia, despite the country's involvement in the killing of Khashoggi. Experts said it is impossible for Mohammad bin Salman to visit Washington or have a direct relationship with the Trump administration.

However, in November 2018, relations between the United States and Saudi Arabia re-strengthened when Trump nominated John Abizaid, a retired U.S. army general who spoke Arabic as U.S. ambassador to the country. Saudi Arabia also brought a fresh face on board, appointing their first female ambassador, Princess Reema bint Bandar Al Saud, to help calm relations in the wake of Khashoggi's death.

On December 12, 2018, United States Senate Committee on Foreign Relations approved a resolution to suspend Yemen conflict-related sales of weapons to Saudi Arabia and impose sanctions on people obstructing humanitarian access in Yemen. Senator Lindsey Graham said, "This sends a global message that just because you're an ally of the United States, you can't kill with impunity. The relationship with Saudi Arabia is not working for America. It is more of a burden than an asset."

On April 8, 2019, U.S. Secretary of State Mike Pompeo announced that 16 Saudi nationals involved in Khashoggi's murder, including Mohammed bin Salman's close aid Saud al-Qahtani, have been barred from entering the U.S.

Armenian genocide recognition

In 2019, the United States Congress issued official recognition of the Armenian genocide, which was the first time the United States has officially acknowledged the genocide, having previously only unofficially or partially recognized the genocide. Turkey, which has traditionally denied such genocide to exist, accused the United States of inflaming tensions. Donald Trump has rejected the resolution by the Congress, citing that his administration's stance on the issue had not changed. Despite Trump's denial, the resolution was sponsored by Trump's ally Saudi Arabia, highlighting increasing disdains and distrust toward Turkey from both Saudi Arabia and the United States.

2019 arms legislation
In the wake of a declining human rights record, on July 17, 2019, lawmakers in Washington backed a resolution to block the sale of precision-guided munitions to the Kingdom of Saudi Arabia and the United Arab Emirates. The measure would have denied billions of dollars of weapon sale to the Saudi-led intervention in Yemen where thousands have been killed in the 4-year long war. President Trump vetoed three such resolutions, and there was not a two-thirds majority in the Senate to override.

On August 3, 2020, Democrats in Congress issued subpoenas in probe of the U.S. Arms Sales to Saudi Arabia and the UAE. Democrats demanded the State Department officials to testify as part of investigation of 2019 arms sale and the dismissal of the State Department's inspector general, Steve Linick, by President Donald Trump in May on Pompeo's advice.

On August 11, 2020, U.S. Secretary of State Mike Pompeo was cleared of charges of wrongdoing in a disputed arms sale to Saudi Arabia and UAE. He had been accused of abuse of power after he used an obscure emergency procedure to bypass congressional refusal to approve an $8 billion arms sale to Saudi Arabia, the United Arab Emirates and Jordan in May 2019.

Pensacola shooting

On December 6, 2019, an aviation student from Saudi Arabia Mohammed Saeed Alshamrani shot three people dead and injured eight others at U.S. Naval Air Station Pensacola in Florida. This attack is concluded as a terrorist attack by FBI following the investigation. Alshamrani himself is a second lieutenant in the Royal Saudi Air Force who was participating in a training program sponsored by the Pentagon as part of a security cooperation agreement with Saudi Arabia. Later, the Navy suspended flight training for all Saudi military aviation students pending the results of the FBI investigation.

Coronavirus outbreak
On July 3, 2020, it was reported that dozens of American diplomats will be leaving Saudi Arabia, along with their families due to the kingdom's failure at containing the coronavirus outbreak, even as its economy reopens. Some of the diplomats believe that the government of Saudi Arabia may be underreporting the number of coronavirus cases by thousands.

Controversies

First conflict
While the U.S.–Saudi relationship was growing, their first conflict began when the disorder broke between the Jews and Arabs in April 1936 in the British-administrated Palestine mandate. The U.S. favored the establishment of an independent Israeli state, but Saudi Arabia on the other hand, the leading nation in the Islamic and Arab world were supporting the Arab position which sparked up their first conflict. In other words, the U.S. oil interest in Saudi Arabia could be held hostage depending on the circumstances of the conflict. U.S. president Franklin D. Roosevelt sent the king a letter indicating that it is true that the U.S. supports the establishment of a Jewish state in Palestine, but it is not in any way responsible for the establishment. Ibn Saud was convinced by the message that the U.S.–Saudi relations had begun to run smooth again. Moreover, in March 1938, CASCO made a big oil discovery in Saudi Arabia booming the oil industry in the country and coincidentally the U.S. became more interested in Saudi oil. As a result, on February 4, 1940, as the World War II was approaching, the U.S. had established a diplomatic presence in Saudi Arabia to have closer relations with the Saudis and to protect it from enemy hand; Bert Fish, former ambassador in Egypt was elected as the U.S. ambassador in Jeddah.

Petrodollar power

The United States dollar is the de facto world currency. The petrodollar system originated in the early 1970s in the wake of the Bretton Woods collapse. President Richard Nixon and his Secretary of State, Henry Kissinger, feared that the abandonment of the international gold standard under the Bretton Woods arrangement (combined with a growing U.S. trade deficit, and massive debt associated with the ongoing Vietnam War) would cause a decline in the relative global demand of the U.S. dollar. In a series of meetings, the United States and the Saudi royal family made an agreement. The United States would offer military protection for Saudi Arabia's oil fields, and in return the Saudi's would price their oil sales exclusively in United States dollars (in other words, the Saudis were to refuse all other currencies, except the U.S. dollar, as payment for their oil exports).

Child abduction

The international abduction of American children to Saudi Arabia provoked sustained criticism and resulted in a Congressional hearing in 2002 where parents of children held in Saudi Arabia gave impassioned testimony related to the abduction of their children. Washington-based Insight ran a series of articles on international abduction during the same period highlighting Saudi Arabia a number of times.

Allegations of funding terrorism

According to a 2009 U.S. State Department communication by Hillary Clinton, United States Secretary of State, (disclosed as part of the Wikileaks U.S. 'cables leaks' controversy in 2010) "donors in Saudi Arabia constitute the most significant source of funding to Sunni terrorist groups worldwide". Part of this funding arises through the zakat (an act of charity dictated by Islam) paid by all Saudis to charities, and amounting to at least 2.5% of their income. Although many charities are genuine, others allegedly serve as fronts for money laundering and terrorist financing operations. While many Saudis contribute to those charities in good faith believing their money goes toward good causes, it has been alleged that others know full well the terrorist purposes to which their money will be applied.

In September 2016, Congress passed the Justice Against Sponsors of Terrorism Act that would allow relatives of victims of the September 11 attacks to sue Saudi Arabia for its government's alleged role in the attacks.

Saudi Arabia was involved in the CIA-led Timber Sycamore covert operation to train and arm Syrian rebels. Some American officials worried that Syrian rebels being supported had ties to al-Qaeda. In October 2015, Saudi Arabia delivered 500 U.S.-made TOW anti-tank missiles to anti-Assad rebels. Reports indicate that some TOW missiles have ended up in the hands of al-Qaeda in Syria and the Islamic State.

Freedom of religion
Ambassador at Large Sam Brownback condemned the Kingdom of Saudi Arabia for its religious freedom abuses, on the release of 2018 Report on International Religious Freedom by the State Department. Brownback called Saudi as "one of the worst actors in the world on religious persecution" and hoped to see "actions take place in a positive direction". The report details discrimination against and maltreatment of Shiite Muslims in Saudi Arabia that includes the mass execution of 34 individuals in April 2019, out of which a majority were Shiite Muslims.

Saudi Royals in the United States
Some members of the Saudi Royal family are known to have committed serious crimes in the United States. Princess Meshael Alayban was involved in human trafficking for a long time.
 Another princess, Princess Bunia assaulted her staff on many occasions.

Extradition issues
Saudi Arabia does not have an extradition treaty with the United States. The Saudi government has on numerous occasions been actively involved with helping Saudi citizens flee the United States after they have committed serious crimes. In 2019, U.S. federal law enforcement officials launched an investigation into cases involving the disappearance of Saudi Arabian students from Oregon and other parts of the country, while they faced charges in the U.S. Amidst the investigation, it has been speculated that the Saudi government helped the students in escaping from the U.S. In October 2019, the U.S. Senate passed a bill by Sen. Ron Wyden of Oregon, requiring the FBI to declassify any information regarding Saudi Arabia's possible role. Oregon officials demand extradition of these suspects by Saudi Arabia since they were involved in violent crimes causing bodily harm and death.

On September 25, 2020, the government of Saudi Arabia offered a bond worth $500,000 as cashier's check to the Tulsa County Sheriff Office from the Saudi Arabian consulate in Houston, Texas to bail out Omar Ba-Abbad, an Uber driver charged with the first-degree murder of a passenger in June 2020. Ba-Abbad was driving for a cab service provider, Uber, in June when he got into a fight with a passenger, Jeremy Shadrick. Ba-Abbad ran over Shadrick in the fight, killing him as a result. Ba-Abbad has claimed in his defense that his act was out of self-defense. However, the District Attorney contradicted his claim with video evidence proving otherwise.

Trade relations

Energy and oil
Saudi Arabia has been an enticing trade partner with the United States from the early 20th century. The biggest commodity traded between the two nations is petroleum. The strength of the relationship is notoriously attributed to the United States' demand on oil throughout the post modern era; approximately 10,000 barrels of petroleum are imported daily to United States since 2012 ("U.S. Total Crude Oil and Products Imports"). Saudi Arabia has consistently been in need of weapons, reinforcement, and arms due to the consistent rising tensions throughout the Middle East during the late 20th century and early 21st century. Post 2016, the United States of America has continued to trade with Saudi Arabia mainly for their oil related goods. The top exports of Saudi Arabia are Crude Petroleum ($96.1B), Refined Petroleum ($13B), Ethylene Polymers($10.1B), Propylene Polymers ($4.93B) and Ethers ($3.6B), using the 1992 revision of the HS (Harmonized System) classification. Its top imports are Cars ($11.8B), Planes, Helicopters, and/or Spacecraft ($3.48B), Packaged Medicaments ($3.34B), Broadcasting Equipment ($3.27B) and Aircraft Parts ($2.18B)".

On August 9, 2020, Saudi Arabia announced that it would cut down on oil supply to the U.S. for the third time in one year, in an attempt to suppress stockpiles in the global oil market to rebalance the demand and supply. However, experts claim that the strategy worked in 2017 when the demand for oil was high and may bear challenges and risks at the present time, due to the impact of the ongoing coronavirus crisis on oil demand.

In August 2021, President Joe Biden's national security adviser Jake Sullivan released a statement calling on OPEC+ to boost oil production to "offset previous production cuts that OPEC+ imposed during the pandemic until well into 2022." On September 28, 2021, Sullivan met in Saudi Arabia with Saudi Crown Prince Mohammed bin Salman to discuss the high oil prices. In late 2021, U.S. Energy Secretary Jennifer Granholm blamed the OPEC oil cartel led by Saudi Arabia for rising motor fuel prices in the United States. As the Financial Times reported on November 4: "The White House has said OPEC+ risks imperiling the global economic recovery by refusing to speed up oil production increases and warned the U.S. was prepared to use ‘all tools’ necessary to lower fuel prices."

In March 2022, Saudi Arabia declined requests from the United States to increase it's oil production. The U.S.-Saudi relations had been strained over the Biden administration's lack of support for the Saudi Arabian–led intervention in Yemen. In April 2022, CIA Director William Burns traveled to Saudi Arabia to meet with bin Salman, asking him to increase the country’s oil production.

In October 2022 in response to cutting oil production despite American objections, Saudi Arabia implied the US was motivated by short-term political considerations of having lower gas prices during the midterm elections, while the US protested that Saudi Arabia was helping Russia's invasion of Ukraine by undermining sanctions, and US National Security Council spokesman John Kirby said "we are re-evaluating our relationship with Saudi Arabia in light of these actions.”

Recent years
In the year 2017, the Kingdom of Saudi Arabia was the United States of America's 20th-ranked export market across the globe and ranked 21st in import markets. The most prominent goods set forth as exports to Saudi Arabia in the designated year (2017) were "aircraft ($3.6 billion), vehicles ($2.6 billion), machinery ($2.2 billion), electrical machinery ($1.6 billion), and arms and ammunition ($1.4 billion). In terms of statistics, the United States – Saudi Arabian trade declined approximately nine percent in U.S. exports in 2017 compared to the year prior; however, 2017 exemplified great reparation of the relationship through a 57% increase of exports from 2007. Imports between the two nations increased approximately 11 percent from 2017 to 2018, which is an overall decline of 47% since the year fiscal 2007. The entities that the United States of America seeks to import from Saudi Arabia has hardly changed over the years: "The top import categories (2-digit HS) in 2017 were: mineral fuels ($18 billion), organic chemicals ($303 million), special other (returns) ($247 million), aluminum ($164 million), and fertilizers ($148 million)".

Saudi Arabia and the United States of America have never fully eliminated their trading agreements however the relationship has experienced consistent disagreements throughout its history from its conception. In the height of the Syrian Civil War, which started in March 2011, Saudi Arabia expressed disapproval of the United States' lack of action in eradicating Syrian President Bashar al-Assad. The United States has consistently expressed disapproval of the treatment of Saudi Arabian women within the confines of the Kingdom. The famous criticisms of the early 21st century behind the relationship between the two countries are due to the mix of disregard for the aforementioned issues and the public knowledge that trade between Saudi Arabia and the United States has trended upwards in the post-9/11 world. In recent years, the imports and exports of U.S- Saudi trades have not shown a percentage increase each year, where it topped out around 2012 and has been in slight fluctuation since, but the overall trend of trade has shown a positive slope. In 2001: U.S. exports were at $5,957.60 and imports were at $13,272.20 (in millions of U.S. dollars) whereas, controversially as it is believed, in 2012 the United States witnessed $17,961.20 in exports and $55,667.00 in imports.

The most damaging occurrence to ever affect the trade relationship between Saudi Arabia and the U.S. occurred on September 11, 2001, due to Saudi Arabia's believed involvement in the 9/11 attacks that occurred in multiple cities throughout the United States. Tensions also rose between the two nations throughout Barack Obama's presidency due to the United States' agreement with Iran, when the U.S. removed oil sanctions on Iran and allowed them to sell their oil to the U.S. The relationship was also hindered by the oil market crash of 2014, propelled by increased shale oil production in the United States, which in turn caused Saudi Arabian exports of oil to decrease by nearly fifty percent. Oil went from around $110 a barrel prior to the 2014 crash, to about $27 a barrel by the beginning of 2016. This relationship worsened after the U.S. legislation passed a bill that allowed victims of the 9/11 attacks to sue the Saudi Arabian government for their losses in 2016.

Military relations

2010 U.S. arms sale to Saudi Arabia
On October 20, 2010, U.S. State Department notified Congress of its intention to make the biggest arms sale in American history—an estimated $60.5 billion purchase by the Kingdom of Saudi Arabia. The package represents a considerable improvement in the offensive capability of the Saudi armed forces.

The U.S. was keen to point out that the arms transfer would increase "interoperability" with U.S. forces. In the 1990–1991 Gulf War, having U.S.-trained Saudi forces, along with military installations built to U.S. specifications, allowed the American armed forces to deploy in a comfortable and familiar battle environment. This new deal would increase these capabilities, as an advanced American military infrastructure is about to be built.

2017 U.S.–Saudi arms deal

U.S. President Donald Trump authorized a nearly $110B arms deal with Saudi Arabia, worth $300B over a ten-year period, signed on the May 20, 2017, this includes training and close co-operation with the Saudi Arabian military. Signed documents included letters of interest and letters of intent and no actual contracts.

U.S. defense stocks reached all-time highs after Donald J. Trump announced a $110 billion arms deal to Saudi Arabia.

Saudi Arabia signed billions of dollars of deals with U.S. companies in the arms industry and petroleum industry, including Lockheed Martin, Boeing, Raytheon, General Dynamics, Northrop Grumman, General Electric, Exxon Mobil, Halliburton, Honeywell, McDermott International, Jacobs Engineering Group, National Oilwell Varco, Nabors Industries, Weatherford International, Schlumberger and Dow Chemical.

In August 2018, a laser-guided Mark 82 bomb sold by the U.S. and built by Lockheed Martin was used in the Saudi-led coalition airstrike on a school bus in Yemen, which killed 51 people, including 40 children.

On May 27, 2020, Bob Menendez, a Democrat on the Senate Foreign Relations Committee claimed during a CNN op-ed that the Trump administration had been covertly working on plans of initiating a new sale of weapons contract worth $1.8 billion to Saudi Arabia.

According to a draft version of the legislation reviewed by the CNN, the Democratic Senators Robert Menendez, Patrick Leahy and Tim Kaine were planning to introduce legislation that put strict human rights constraints on the United States foreign arms sales, in the wake of the arms sold in the past by the U.S. to countries with poor human rights records like, Saudi Arabia and United Arab Emirates. President Donald Trump has also received wide criticism for declaring an emergency to bypass the opposition, to sell weapons worth billions of dollars to Saudi Arabia and the United Arab Emirates, accused of conducting war crimes.

Notable diplomatic visits

After President George W. Bush's two visits to Saudi Arabia in 2008—which was the first time a U.S. president visited a foreign country twice in less than four months—and King Abdullah's three visits to the U.S.—2002, 2005, and 2008—the relations have surely reached their peak. The two nations have expanded their relationship beyond oil and counter-terrorism efforts. For example, King Abdullah has allocated funds for young Saudis to study in the United States. One of the most important reasons that King Abdullah has given full scholarships to young Saudis is to give them western perspective and to impart a positive impression of Saudi Arabia on the American people. On the other hand, President Bush discussed the world economic crisis and what the U.S.–Saudi relationship can do about it. During meetings with the Saudis, the Bush Administration took the Saudi policies very seriously because of their prevalent economic and defensive presence in the region and its great media influence on the Islamic world. By and large, the two leaders have made many decisions that deal with security, economics, and business aspects of the relationship, making it in the top of its fame.

In early 2018, the Crown Prince Mohammad bin Salman visited the United States where he met with many top politicians, business people, and Hollywood stars, including President Donald Trump, Bill and Hillary Clinton, Henry Kissinger, Bill Gates, Jeff Bezos and George W. Bush.

See also

 Foreign relations of Saudi Arabia
 Foreign relations of the United States
 Embassy of Saudi Arabia, Washington, D.C.
 List of ambassadors of the United States to Saudi Arabia
 Saudi Arabia lobby in the United States

References

Further reading
 Anderson, Irvine H. Aramco, the United States, and Saudi Arabia (Princeton University Press, 2014).
 Beling, Willard A. ed. King Faisal and the Modernisation Of Saudi Arabia (2019).
 Blanchard, Christopher M. "Saudi Arabia: background and U.S. relations." Congressional Research Service (CRS) Reports and Issue Briefs (U.S. Congressional Research Service, 2020) online U.S. government document (not copyright); 22,700 words.
 Bronson, Rachel, Thicker than Oil: America's Uneasy Partnership with Saudi Arabia (Oxford University Press, 2006) excerpt
 Cordesman, Anthony H. Saudi Arabia: Guarding the desert kingdom (1997).
 Evers, Miles M. (2022). "Discovering the prize: information, lobbying, and the origins of US–Saudi security relations". European Journal of International Relations.
 Ghattas, Kim. Black Wave: Saudi Arabia, Iran, and the Forty-Year Rivalry That Unraveled Culture, Religion, and Collective Memory in the Middle East (2020). excerpt
 Hart, Parker T. Saudi Arabia and the United States (Indiana UP, 1998) online
 Hiro, Dilip. Cold War in the Islamic World: Saudi Arabia, Iran And The Struggle For Supremacy. (2019) excerpt
 Koelbl, Susanne. Behind the Kingdom's Veil: Inside the New Saudi Arabia Under Crown Prince Mohammed bin Salman (2020) excerpt
 Lacey, Robert. The Kingdom: Arabia and the House of Saud (1981). online I
 Lippman, Thomas W. Inside the Mirage: America's Fragile Partnership with Saudi Arabia (2005)
 Long, David E. The United States and Saudi Arabia: Ambivalent Allies (Routledge, 2019). excerpt
 McFarland, Victor. Oil Powers: A History of the U.S.-Saudi Alliance (2020) online review also excerpt
 Mackintosh-Smith, Tim. Arabs: A 3,000-Year History of Peoples, Tribes and Empires (Yale UP, 2019)
 Parker, Chad. Making the Desert Modern: Americans, Arabs, and Oil on the Saudi Frontier, 1933–1973 (U of Massachusetts Press, 2015).
 Riedel, Bruce. Kings and presidents: Saudi Arabia and the United States since FDR (Brookings Institution Press, 2019)_.
 Vitalis, Robert. America's Kingdom: Mythmaking on the Saudi Oil Frontier (Stanford University Press, 2006). excerpt

External links

 History of Saudi Arabia – U.S. relations
 Embassy of Saudi Arabia- Washington, DC
 Embassy of U.S.A. – Riyadh
 Consulate General of U.S.A. – Dhahran
 Consulate General of U.S.A. – Jeddah
 Odah Sultan Odah, Saudi-American Relations 1968–1972
 Saudi Arabia: Background and U.S. Relations

 
United States
Bilateral relations of the United States